Douglas Ian Lewis (March 3, 1921 – August 10, 1994) was a Canadian professional ice hockey forward who played three games in the National Hockey League for the Montreal Canadiens. He was born in Winnipeg, Manitoba.

External links

Obituary at LostHockey.com

1921 births
1994 deaths
Boston Olympics players
Buffalo Bisons (AHL) players
Canadian ice hockey forwards
Ice hockey people from Winnipeg
Montreal Canadiens players
Springfield Indians players